The 1961 South Dakota Coyotes football team was an American football team that represented the University of South Dakota in the North Central Conference (NCC) during the 1961 NCAA College Division football season. In its sixth season under head coach Ralph Stewart, the team compiled a 1–8 record (0–6 against NCC opponents), finished in seventh place out of seven teams in the NCC, and was outscored by a total of 245 to 126. In the final game of the season, the Coyotes snapped an 11-game losing streak dating back to October 29, 1960. The team played its home games at Inman Field in Vermillion, South Dakota.

Schedule

References

South Dakota
South Dakota Coyotes football seasons
South Dakota Coyotes football